Richlands High School is located in Richlands, Virginia in Tazewell County. Athletic teams compete in the Virginia High School League's AA Southwest District in Region IV.

Academics
The 2006 History TCAC (Tazewell County Academic Competition) team won their competition.
The 2007 Science TCAC team tied with the Tazewell Team (4–2) but in the end Tazewell had more points giving them the trophy.

Athletic championships
The Richlands Blue Tornados have won two different VHSL AA State Championships and numerous Regional and District Championships in a variety of sports.

The Richlands Football team had posted an outstanding 33 game regular season win streak lasting from the 2004 season to the '07 season and 3 state championship game appearances. With 2 undefeated regular seasons in that time period, along with the "Perfect Storm" of 14–0 in the 2006 campaign culminating in a state championship, they have been marked with much recent success.

Their major rivals are Tazewell High School, and Graham High School.

Richlands and Tazewell play for the James C. Ramey Cup. Richlands leads the all-time series against their county rivals, 53-42-2, including 17 straight wins from 2004-2019. 
The Blues shut own the Bulldogs for four straight seasons from 1994-1997 (116-0) and from 2016-2019 (144-0), the Richlands High School Classes of 1998 and 2020, played their varsity careers without conceding a single point to Tazewell.

Richlands also maintains long-standing active rivalries against their other county rival, the Graham G-Men. The two teams met for the 100th time in 2021, a 35-0 victory at Ernie Hicks Stadium for the G-Men. Graham leads the all-time series 56-39-5, including 6 straight victories dating to 2017.

Richlands also had a long-standing rivalry against the Grundy Golden Wave, having played every year from 1944 to 2010, and again from 2013 to 2016. Richlands leads that all-time series 58-23-3, winning every matchup between the two since 1998 (17 straight victories). The two teams have not met in regular season play since 2016, the result of Grundy’s reclassification to 1A play. 

Richlands has also played Virginia High, Marion, Gate City, and Abingdon over 50 times each.

Richlands leads the RL-VA series, 40-28-2.

Richlands leads the RL-MAR series, 45-17-1.

Richlands leads the RL-GC series, 27-24-1.

Richlands leads the RL-AB series, 29-16-6.

State Football Champions 1992 & 2006

The Blue Tornado Football Team has a 550-385-34 record all-time. The Blues will play their 1,000th game in the 2024 or 2025 season.
     State Football Runner-Ups: 2004,2005,2007,2010,2016

State Softball Champions 1995, 1996 & 2019

Traditions 
The School has a longstanding tradition of "Blue News" wherein the school's seniors write a news report each week. The tradition recently switched to a YouTube Channel.

Marching band
The Richlands High School Blue Tornado Band has won many awards including overall best band at the AT&T Cotton Bowl and 14 time Virginia Honor Band titles. The Band has also participated in 2 of Macy's Thanksgiving Day Parade in New York City and the Inaugural Parades of multiple Virginia Governors.

Yearbook
The Tornado yearbook has won several honors in past years. The 2009 "Taking the World by Storm" book won a first place VHSL Award and Taylor Publishing National Yearbook Honorable Mention. The 2010 "Notorious" book also won a first place VHSL Award.

Scholastic Bowl
The 2021-22 Richlands High School Scholastic Bowl team coached by Christopher Hale finished third in the state competition, their best performance to date.

Other 
The school Has an E-Sports team

DECA

The School has a Gifted Program

Notable alumni 
 Mike Compton – American football center for the Detroit Lions and the New England Patriots.
 Richard Cranwell – Chairman of the Democratic Party of Virginia
Devon Johnson - Marshall Thundering Herd football Carolina Panthers
Austin Edwards- Former Virginia State Trooper, who travelled across the country and murdered a California couple and their daughter. Edwards was catfishing a 15 year-old girl, pretending to be a 17 year-old teen himself. Edwards had recently purchased a house in Saltville, Virginia where he had blacked out the windows of the house. Edwards set fire to the California house after killing the girl's grandparents and mother. Edwards shot himself in the midst of a shootout with the California police.

References

External links
 
 Listen Live
 

Public high schools in Virginia
Schools in Tazewell County, Virginia